The Mafolie Great House, in Mafolie in the Northside subdistrict north of Charlotte Amalie in St. Thomas, U.S. Virgin Islands, was built in 1795.  The estate was originally part of Estate Catherineberg, but was sold to Captain Sonderburg in 1962. It was listed on the National Register of Historic Places in 1978.  The listing included three contributing buildings and a contributing structure.

The name means "My folly" in French.  The larger house is unusual in being composed of two parallel one-story structures joined by a roof.

The house was headquarters of a Brazilian astronomical expedition in 1882 which studied a transit of Venus.  The area has been said to have "an excellent panoramic view".

References

Houses in the United States Virgin Islands
Plantation houses in the United States
Plantations in the United States Virgin Islands
Saint John, U.S. Virgin Islands
Houses completed in 1795
Houses on the National Register of Historic Places in the United States Virgin Islands
1795 establishments in North America
1790s establishments in the Caribbean
1795 establishments in Denmark
18th century in the Danish West Indies
Northside, Saint Thomas, U.S. Virgin Islands